Caryocolum divergens is a moth of the family Gelechiidae. It is found in eastern Afghanistan.

References

Moths described in 1989
divergens
Moths of Asia